Our Lady of Bethlehem (Spanish: la Virgen de Belén) is a Flemish-style oil painting that arrived in Puerto Rico. Specialists in 15th-century art attribute the painting to the school of Brussels painter, Rogier van der Weyden, or to an anonymous disciple of his school.

Origin of the tradition

According to tradition, the Milk Grotto, not far from Bethlehem, is the site where the Holy Family took refuge during the Massacre of the Innocents, before their flight to Egypt. While there, the Virgin Mary nursed her holy Child. Some drops of milk sprinkled the walls, changing to white the color of the stone. The site is venerated by both Christians and Muslims.

According to Franciscan, Brother Lawrence, an American who oversees the grotto and chapel for the Franciscan Custody of the Holy Land, the grotto is at least 2,000 years old. Early Christians came to pray here, but the first structure was built around 385. Known in Arabic as “Magharet el Saiyidee” (The Grotto of Our Lady), the grotto, hollowed out of limestone, has become a place of pilgrimage for couples hoping to conceive a child.

A second legend identifies this site as the location where the Three Kings visited the Holy Family, and presented their gifts of gold, frankincense and myrrh to the Divine Child. A tradition going back to the 7th century, located at this site the burial place of the innocent victims killed by Herod the Great after the birth of Jesus.

The Devotion to Our Lady of the Milk requests husbands and wives to pray together the third of the joyful mysteries of the rosary, meditating on the Nativity of the Lord.

There is also a Shrine of Our Lady of "La Leche y Buen Parto" (Spanish for “Our Lady of the Milk and Happy Delivery”) in St. Augustine, Florida.

The tradition of milk dates back to the first centuries of Christianity. Those converting to Christianity were given a mixture of milk and honey to drink, which in the early churches of Egypt, Rome, and North Africa was solemnly blessed at the Easter and Pentecost vigils. Milk with honey symbolized the union of the two natures in Christ. The custom of giving milk with honey to the newly baptized did not last long, but this tradition is visible in artistic representations.

Details
The image is painted on a wooden canvas. It measures 37.2 cm by 65 cm. The woman in the painting, the Virgin Mary, is medium-sized, and has some color on her face, lose hair, rays around the head, and eyes gazing upon the Child in swaddling clothes. She has one of her breasts uncovered, with small drops of milk falling towards the Child's lips. He reclines in his mother's arms, reciprocating the gaze of the mother. The Virgin Mary is wearing a blue blouse (not black), and a dark red or crimson mantle. Behind her, a dark grove of trees looks like a mountain.

The painting appeared next to a fountain, in the place where the future Dominican convent in San Juan would be founded, sometime between 1511 and 1522.

According to tradition, during the English invasion of 1598, and Dutch invasion of 1625, the painting was hidden and later found. In 1714, a copy was placed in the Cathedral of Saint John the Baptist (Cathedral of San Juan Bautista), in San Juan.

During the Siege of Abercromby (1797), bishop Juan Bautista Zengotita gave orders for daily public prayer, to be held in parishes of the city.

According to Cayetano Coll y Toste's legend, participants, mainly women, sang songs and litanies, and carried candles or torches in their hands. The painting of Our Lady of Bethlehem was carried through the city to ask God for help. According to this legend the invading army, frightened by such imposing sight, decided to withdraw and not attack the city. Today in the Caleta de San Juan, next to the ancient wall and facing the Bay of San Juan, there is a sculpture called "La Rogativa" or "The Public Petition," which commemorates this chapter in the history of Puerto Rico.

Painter José Campeche attributed the protection of the city to Our Lady of Bethlehem. A painting meant to be a votive offering gives witness to the fact that inhabitants began to consider Our Lady as the "Protectora de la ciudad", or "Guardian of the City." He made many reproductions of the original Our Lady of Bethlehem, some of which are to be found in Old San Juan's National Gallery and the museum of the Universidad de Puerto Rico in Río Piedras.

Juan Alejo de Arizmendi, the first Puerto Rican bishop, spread devotion to the painting. In 1806 he granted forty days of indulgence to those who said a Hail Mary in front of the image, praying to God for Church intentions. He asked to place a copy in Santos Ángeles Custodios parish, in Yabucoa, and commended artist De La Espada to carve a wooden image that is located in the main altar of San Isidro Labrador's parish, in Sabana Grande.

Towards 1864, priest Ven. Jerónimo Usera y Alarcón wrote a Noveen to Our Lady of Bethlehem. In the prologue he gave witness to the courage of the men and women who took part in the Siege of 1797, and called her Fellow Citizen of all Puerto Ricans.

The original Our Lady of Bethlehem disappeared from San José Church of Old San Juan (the old St. Thomas Church of the Dominicans) in 1972. A reproduction was made in Belgium and presented to the people of Puerto Rico on January 3, 2012. At the same date, the Angelical Confraternity of Our Lady of Bethlehem was restored.

Notable representations
In the Catacombs of Priscilla, in Rome, a 2nd-century pictorial representation of the Virgin Mary may be found. Most likely it is a breastfeeding Virgin. There are other symbols referring to milk in the catacombs.

In the church of the Chilandari Monastery in Mount Athos, Greece, there is a "Virgin of Milk" in Byzantine style of the 11th and 12th centuries. It is called Panagia Galaktotrophusa.

During the 13th century, in the town of Saydnaya, near Damascus, next to a wooden pictorial representation of the Virgin, there was an inscription in Latin: Hoc oleum ex ubere Genitris Dei Virginia Mariae emanavit in loco, qui Sardinia vocatur, ubi genitilitas est, ex imagine lignea, which means: "This oil flowed from the breast of the Virgin Mary, Mother of God, sculpted in wood. It took in a place gentiles call Sardinia." It was moved from Constantinople to Saydnaya, probably in the 11th century. Even after the 14th century, it still gave oil or milk. Templars distributed oil or milk among pilgrims in many countries. It is very likely that this famous shrine of Saydnaya, which was a pilgrimage place for Christians of the East and West, is the source (or one of the major sources) of this artistic theme.

Representations of the Virgin Mary in Flanders and the Netherlands
Responding to the devotion and worship of the Virgin in Europe during the Middle Ages, early Flemish painters produced numerous images of Mary. At the end of the 15th and 16th centuries, and up until the Council of Trent (1545–1563), the representations of the "Virgin of Milk" were popular in Flanders. Rogier Van der Weyden, presumed creator or inspirer of Puerto Rican "Lady of Bethlehem", was a Flemish painter of fame and prestige in the 15th century. In 1435 he left his home town of Tournai to settle in Brussels, where he was appointed premier painter of the city. None of the paintings attributed to him are signed.

Attraction for his art was not limited to the region of Brussels. He received orders from distant regions such as Italy, Savoy, cities along the Rhine, and Spain. No historical data has been found that certify how this Flemish painting arrived in the New World. It is possible that Spanish Dominican friars coming to Puerto Rico took it along with them on their trip to their first convent in Old San Juan. It is also possible that the first Spanish settlers (Juan Ponce de León with others), or even the first anonymous Franciscan friars who came to the New World, may have carried it on board.

Notes

References
(Most in Spanish)
 Coll y Toste, Cayetano, "La Virgen de Belén" and "Las once mil vírgenes", Leyendas puertorriqueñas.
 Cuesta Mendoza, Antonio, Biblioteca Histórica, Vol I, 1508–1700, Imprenta “Arte y cine”, Dominican Republic 1948, p. 298-299.
 Delgado Mercado, Osiris, "Campeche, el primer gran pintor puertorriqueño", in Voces de la cultura. Testimonios sobre personajes, cultura, instituciones y eventos históricos en Puerto Rico y el Caribe, Fundación Voz y Centro, San Juan 2006, p. 1-12.
 Delgado Mercado, Osiris, José Campeche. El concepto invención y fuentes formativas de su arte, Ateneo Puertorriqueño, Hato Rey 1990.
 Friedländer, Max, The Master of Flémalle and Rogier van der Weyden. The Flemish Primitives, Peters, Leuven 1967.
 Norbert Ubarri, Miguel, "La Virgen de Belén, ¿dónde está?", Claridad (10 to 16 April 2008), p. 16 y 29.
 Rodríguez León, Mario, El obispo Juan Alejo de Arizmendi ante el proceso revolucionario y el inicio de la emancipación de América Latina y el Caribe, Editorial Amigo del Hogar, Dominican Republic 2003, p. 133.
 Rodríguez, Jorge, "Aparecen nuevas obras de Campeche, Oller y Albizu", El Vocero (6 May 2008)
 Trens, Manuel, Maria. Iconografía de la Virgen en el arte español, Plus-Ultra, Madrid 1946.
 "Para tratar sobre la privación de los Altares de N.S. de Belén y Altagracia; y sobre lo acaecido en la Procesión del Viernes Santo", Actas del Cabildo Catedral, fol. 100v-103v
 Usera y Alarcón, Ven. D. Jerónimo, Novena a la Milagrosa Imagen de Nuestra Señora de Belén", Llamada comúnmente "La Aparecida" de San Juan de Puerto Rico, Martín Printing, San Juan de Puerto Rico, republished in 2015.

External links
 http://www.virgendebelenpr.org/ Puerto Rican website dedicated to the painting Our Lady of Bethlehem and its history (in Spanish).

Gothic paintings
Flemish paintings
Paintings of the Madonna and Child

es:Virgen de Belén